Abraham Myers (also Abram Myers; 14 May 181120 June 1889) was a military officer in the United States and Confederate States Armies.

Personal life
Abraham Charles Myers (also Abram) was born in Georgetown, South Carolina, on 14 May 1811.  Myers was accepted to the United States Military Academy on 1 July 1828; after repeating his freshman year, he graduated on 1 July 1833.  In February 1850, Major General David E. Twiggs named Fort Myers for his future son-in-law; Myers married Marion Twiggs before 1861.

In 1864 and 1865, Myers lived in the state of Georgia, "almost in want, on the charity of friends".  The Dictionary of American Biography believes he traveled through Europe from 1866–1877 before dying in Washington, D.C., on 20 June 1889.  Myers was buried at St. Paul's Cemetery in Alexandria, Virginia, under a headstone that read "Gen. A. C. Myers".

US military career
After accepting the rank of brevetted second lieutenant in the United States Army on 1 July 1833, Myers was stationed in Baton Rouge, Louisiana with the 4th Infantry Regiment.  He received a promotion to full second lieutenant on 31 December 1835 before serving in the Second Seminole War.  Myers served in Florida from 1836–1838, fighting at Camp Izard and Oloklikaha, and receiving his promotion to first lieutenant on 6 September 1837.  From 1838–1840, Myers worked in the recruiting service; with a promotion to staff captain on 21 November 1839, he transferred to the Quartermaster Department in St. Augustine, Florida.  Myers returned to fighting in the Second Seminole War from 1841–1842.

Captain Myers was stationed at Fort Moultrie from 1842–1845.  During the Mexican–American War, Myers served under Zachary Taylor at the Battle of Palo Alto and the Battle of Resaca de la Palma; his "gallant and meritorious conduct" thereat earned him a promotion to brevetted major.  After his transfer to Winfield Scott's command, Myers fought at the Battle of Churubusco (receiving a brevetted promotion to colonel or lieutenant colonel for "gallant conduct"), and was the Army of Mexico's chief quartermaster from April–June 1848.

From 1848 to 1861, Myers served the Quartermaster Department at various posts, mostly in the Southern United States.  While stationed in New Orleans on 28 Jan 1861, at the behest of Louisiana state officials, Myers "surrendered the quartermaster and commissary stores in his possession" before immediately resigning from the US Army.

Confederate military career
On 16 Mar 1861, Myers was appointed a lieutenant-colonel in the Confederate Quartermaster-General's Department.  He was made the Confederacy's first acting quartermaster-general on 25 March 1861; the role was made official that December, with a promotion to colonel on 15 Feb 1862.  After the Confederate capital moved from Montgomery, Alabama, to Richmond, Virginia, Myers' offices were made on the second floor of the building at the southwest corner of 9th and Main Street; his staff would eventually swell to 88 clerks—the largest office in the Confederacy's supply bureau. As president of the military board, Myers helped design the first Confederate Army uniform: "a blue flannel shirt, gray flannel pants, a red flannel undershirt, cotton drawers, wool socks, boots, and a cap."

As quartermaster-general, Myers was hampered by insufficient funds, the failure of the Confederate States dollar, and the poor railroads in the South; the Confederate States Army was never adequately supplied by Myers, especially with regard to clothing and shoes.  By the 1930s, it was determined that while Myers had been very skilled at accountancy, he could not think outside his US training and experience nor could he rise above "the laxity, carelessness, and inefficiency of remote subordinates".

End of service
Myers was ousted as quartermaster-general around the turn of 1864.

The 1934 Dictionary of American Biography says that Confederate President Jefferson Davis appointed Brigadier General Alexander Lawton as Myers' replacement on 7 August 1863 "in the interest of efficiency", but that the Confederate States Senate rejected the appointment on procedural grounds.  Davis resubmitted Lawton to the Confederate Congress, and that body confirmed the general on 17 February 1864.  When Myers refused to serve under Lawton, he "found himself, on a technicality, 'out of the army.

In 2000, Robert N. Rosen's The Jewish Confederates said that while there had been complaints about Myers from War Secretary James Seddon and General Robert E. Lee, President Davis had used the letter of the law to appoint his friend—Lawton—in retaliation for Myers' wife having called Varina Davis a "squaw".  (Though as a Jew, Myers had seen some antisemitism in the Confederate ranks, Rosen explicitly argued that it had no bearing on Davis' actions.)  Despite the efforts of the congress, Richmond society, and the Fourth Estate, Lawton was confirmed in February 1864.  Rosen goes on to say that Myers refused to serve under Lawton, and though the Confederate States Attorney General opined that Myers was not in the army any longer, he himself maintained that "he was a colonel and a commissioned officer and remained on the army list".

Bruce Allardice's 2008 book Confederate Colonels concurs with much of the Rosen's analysis, though merely says that Myers resigned on 10 August 1863.

References

External links
 

1811 births
1889 deaths
American military personnel of the Mexican–American War
Confederate States Army officers
death in Washington, D.C.
Jewish American military personnel
Jewish Confederates
people from Georgetown, South Carolina
people of South Carolina in the American Civil War
quartermasters
United States Army personnel of the Seminole Wars
United States Military Academy alumni